Ghatkopar (Pronunciation: [ɡʱaːʈkopəɾ]) is a suburb in eastern Mumbai. The area is served by the railway station on the Central Line of the Mumbai Suburban Railway and the metro station on Line 1 of the Mumbai Metro. The eastern part has a large Gujarati population.

History
Ghatkopar in the 1920s was a village ringed by creeks and salt pans. It was administered by a municipal council led by a Collector of the Suburban District. It became part of Greater Bombay in 1945.

There are many interpretations to how Ghatkopar got its name. Some say it refers to the hill range tapering off at Thane, "Ghat ke oopar", which roughly means "on top of hill". Others believe the name is derived from the Marathi word for "corner" of the Western Ghats- "Kopara", therefore, Ghat-kopara.

The names given to roads in Ghatkopar offer an interesting peek into its recent history. It has roads like Nowrojee Lane for Nowrojee Sheth, Cama Lane after Lady Cama, Hingwala Lane after a family dealing with asafoetida.

Mumbai Metro Project
The Versova-Andheri-Ghatkopar Metro corridor of the Mumbai Metro project is an 11.07 km long double line corridor on an elevated viaduct. The route uses Standard Gauge air-conditioned trains with 12 elevated stations. It has a carrying capacity of 60,000 persons per hour and the commuting time on the entire stretch is 21 minutes. The commute time between Versova and Ghatkopar was reduced by 70 minutes by this line.  Metro started running successfully from July 2014.

See also 
2000 Mumbai landslide
Ghatkopar metro station
Ghatkopar railway station

References

Suburbs of Mumbai